Mansveld may refer to:

 Aad Mansveld (1944–1991), Dutch football player
 Debby Mansveld, Dutch cyclist; see 2006 UCI Women's Road World Rankings
 Freddy Mansveld (20th century), Belgian bobsledder
 Wilma Mansveld (born 1962), Dutch politician

See also 
 Mansfeld (disambiguation)

Dutch-language surnames